miR-33 is a family of microRNA precursors, which are processed by the Dicer enzyme to give mature microRNAs. miR-33 is found in several animal species, including humans. In some species there is a single member of this family which gives the mature product mir-33. In humans there are two members of this family called mir-33a and mir-33b, which are located in intronic regions within two protein-coding genes for Sterol regulatory element-binding proteins (SREBP-2 and SREBP-1) respectively.

Function
miR-33 plays a role in lipid metabolism; it downregulates a number of ABC transporters, including ABCA1 and ABCG1, which in turn regulate cholesterol and HDL generation. Further related roles of miR-33 have been proposed in fatty acid degradation and in macrophage response to low-density lipoprotein.
It has been suggested that miR-33a and miR-33b regulates genes Involved in fatty acid metabolism and insulin signalling.

Potential binding sites for mir-33 have been identified in the cDNA of tumour suppressor p53. Further, study has shown that miR-33 is able to repress p53 expression and p53-induced apoptosis. This function is thought to be related to hematopoietic stem cell renewal.

Applications
miR-33, along with miR-122, could be used to diagnose or treat conditions related to metabolic disorders and cardiovascular disease.

References

External links
 

MicroRNA